Sonya Hussyn Bukharee (born 15 July 1991) is a Pakistani actress and model. She made her acting debut with a supporting role in 2011 series Dareecha. She has then appeared as main lead in several serials like Marasim (2014), Nikah (2015), Kisay Chahoon (2016) and Haasil (2017). Her performance as Pakeeza Islam in 2017 series Aisi Hai Tanhai earned her nomination for Best TV-Actress at Lux Style Awards. 

Hussyn received Pakistan International Screen Award of Best Television Actress Jury for her performance in physiological-thriller Saraab in 2021.

Early life 
Sonya was born in Karachi into a Sindhi family. Her father is a businessman in construction works and mother is a housewife. Her grandmother was chief manager at House Building Finance Company. She has two sisters and one brother.

Career 
She has appeared in television serials aired on ARY Digital and Hum TV. She is known for her work on the series Mere Hamrahi, Mein Hari Piya, Marasim, and Angeline Malik's Kitni Girhain Baqi Hain. Moreover, she is known for portraying supporting roles in Meri Behan Meri Dewrani, Nadamat, Dareecha, Umm-e-Kulsoom and Shehryar Shehzadi. She has appeared in period drama Aangan portraying the role of Salma telecast on Hum TV.

Sonya made her debut on the big screen with Jami's Moor in which she played the supporting character of Amber and later starred in the leading role in Azaadi. She will also be seen in upcoming films Tich Button, Sorry: A Love Story and Lufangey.

Filmography

Short film

Television

Special appearance

Awards and nominations

References

External links
 
 

Living people
Pakistani female models
Pakistani television actresses
Pakistani television hosts
21st-century Pakistani actresses
1991 births
Pakistani women television presenters
Sindhi people